Lillooet Airport  is located  east southeast of Lillooet, British Columbia, Canada.

References

Registered aerodromes in British Columbia
Lillooet Country